Old Sequoia is a 1945 American animated short film directed by Jack King featuring Donald Duck. The cartoon was produced in Technicolor by Walt Disney Productions and released to theaters on December 21, 1945 by RKO Radio Pictures.

Plot
An old sequoia tree labeled "Old Sequoia" sits in a National Park (its plaque labeled "Born: ????") and is surrounded by a fence.  However, two beavers are chewing down one tree after another and getting closer to Old Sequoia.

Up in a nearby ranger lookout post, Donald Duck, as Agent 13, is sleeping precariously in a chair leaning back on a loose side board that overlooks a deep lake a thousand feet below when the telephone rings. After Donald avoids falling, gets smacked by the loose board, and answers the telephone, the chief ranger (possibly Pete) scolds Donald for ignoring the phone after the first ring and warns him that his carelessness has resulted in him losing too many trees in his sector, adding before hanging up "if Old Sequoia goes, YOU GO!". Just as Donald gets mad at being threatened of being fired, the chief ranger rings back and orders Donald to get to work protecting Old Sequoia.

Donald manages to sight the beavers chewing on a tree nearby to Old Sequoia, grabs his double barreled shotgun, and runs down the steps of the lookout post, only to trip and fall down the steps and get hit through his campaign hat by his gun which was dropped on the way, after which he repairs his hat by stepping out of its brim and fitting it back below the crown. The beavers (sounding like Chip 'n' Dale) are just getting to work on chewing down another tree when Donald appears and threatens them at gunpoint to get lost. One beaver tries to get away, but Donald is standing on his tail.  When the beaver orders Donald to get off, Donald flatly refuses, so the beaver uses his tail to throw Donald against the tree, which makes it fall over. As the tree crashes down and Donald lands, his gun goes off, blasting out part of the trunk of another tree, making it fall over and hit Donald on the head, making a lump break through it.

Meanwhile, the beavers come across Old Sequoia and, thinking they've hit the jackpot of all tree chomping, get ready to chew it down, but Donald pokes the gun in their faces. The beavers try to sneak away, but Donald uses both the barrels of the shotgun to bring them back. Just as Donald is beginning to pull the trigger to kill the beavers, the telephone in the lookout post rings.  After a brief moment of panic and deadlocked decisions (if Donald doesn't answer the phone, he will lose his job, but if he does answer it, it will give the beavers a chance to get away), Donald rushes away to answer the phone. It's the chief ranger calling to make sure Donald is guarding Old Sequoia, but scolds him for answering the phone late and orders him to go back to work.

Later, as Donald is patrolling around Old Sequoia when he hears the beavers and chewing noises coming from inside one of the giant roots, leading Donald to conclude that the beavers are trying to chew down Old Sequoia (and avoid him at the same time) by doing it from the inside.  After teasing Donald with knocks on the root, the beavers make it to the main trunk and begin chewing. Every time Donald spies sawdust coming out of a hole and plugs it, the beavers chew somewhere else, until there are holes in the trunk spitting out sawdust. Donald tries scooping the sawdust back into Old Sequoia, but one beaver catches it on his tail and flings it back on to Donald, turning him in to a giant sand duck.

Having just about had it with the beavers, Donald leaves and comes back with a tractor fitted with a vacuum pipe, which sucks in the sawdust through one end and ejects the sawdust into the trunk through another end. This move, however, only ends up over-stuffing the now hollowed out part of the trunk and blows off the outside parts, exposing the beavers (coughing from the explosion) who've chewed the trunk so that now the whole tree is supported on a thin little spindle of wood. Seeing the damage  he and the beavers have done, Donald races over and tries to hold up Old Sequoia, but the beavers get the idea to "help" Donald make Old Sequoia fall over. One beaver slaps his tail on the ground so hard that it shakes the leaves off a bush and shakes Donald and Old Sequoia to the point where there's no stopping it from meeting its fate. One beaver makes his tail into the shape of a megaphone and the other beaver shouts "Timber!" through it, after which, both beavers run away until they're out of sight.

Knowing that Old Sequoia will surely fall over as his strength and the thin spindle are giving out, Donald quickly races away, props up Old Sequoia with long poles of wood, and covers up the handiwork with the two outside halves of the trunk (quickly noticing that the half with the plaque is upside down and turns it back right side up). Donald tells Old Sequoia that it's safe now, but the poles of wood show signs of giving out, forcing Donald to try again at keeping Old Sequoia stable.  At that moment, the telephone in the lookout post rings (its sound waves pushing against one side of Old Sequoia), forcing Donald to rush back to the lookout post to answer it. It's the chief ranger calling again and asks Donald "How's Old Sequoia comin'?"  Donald looks out, sees the poles of wood and outside parts of the hollowed out trunk finally give way, and Old Sequoia fall in the direction of the lookout post, which makes him reply "Just coming fine!" in an embarrassed tone of voice.

As Old Sequoia falls past the lookout post, it reaches out a branch like a hand and grabs the lookout post, pulling it off its legs.  After that, Old Sequoia crashes down on to a cliff, falls off over the side, and splashes down deep into the lake below.  Underwater, in the ruins of the lookout post, Donald is angrily thinking about getting even with the beavers when the telephone rings. Donald swims over and answers it. It's the chief ranger ringing again, but since Donald has let Old Sequoia get lost to nature, the chief ranger angrily FIRES him.  This makes Donald throw a fit and start ranting and raving, stirring up a lot of bubbles in the process, of which some them of escape through the iris out.

Voice cast
 Clarence Nash  as Donald Duck
 Billy Bletcher as Donald's boss

Home media
The short was released on December 6, 2005 on Walt Disney Treasures: The Chronological Donald, Volume Two: 1942-1946.

Additional releases include:
Walt Disney's Classic Cartoon Favorites Extreme Adventure Fun" Volume 7

Other titles
 Denmark: Skovens beskytter
 Sweden: Kalle Anka som skogvaktare

References

External links
 IMDb page : 

Donald Duck short films
1945 films
1945 comedy films
1940s English-language films
1940s Disney animated short films
1945 animated films
Films directed by Jack King
Films produced by Walt Disney
Films scored by Oliver Wallace
American comedy short films
American animated short films
RKO Pictures short films
RKO Pictures animated short films
Films about ducks
Films about rodents
Films about trees